Francis Johnson (21 May 1880 – 28 May 1951) was an Australian cricketer. He played seventeen first-class matches for New South Wales between 1903/04 and 1908/09.

See also
 List of New South Wales representative cricketers

References

External links
 

1880 births
1951 deaths
Australian cricketers
New South Wales cricketers
Cricketers from Sydney